Sigmund Spielmann was an Austrian Volapükist. He received his Volapük teacher's diploma in 1887.

Works
 1887. Volapük-Almanach für 1888, verfasst von Sigmund Spielmann. I. Jahrgang. Lekaled volapüka plo yel balmil jöltum jölsejöl, pelautöl fa Spielmann Sigmund. Yelüp balid. Leipzig: Mayer. (Vödem rigädik.)
 1888. (Dab. 4id, pärevidöl ä pägretükumöl) Die Weltsprache Volapük in drei Lectionen. Leipzig: Mayer.
 1889. M.b.p.b. Volapük-Almanach / Lekaled Volapüka plo yel balmil jöltum jölsezül fa Spielmann Sigmund. Yelüp telid. Leipzig: Mayer.

Literature
 Haupenthal, Reinhard. 1982. Volapük-Bibliographie. Hildesheim, Zürich, New York: Georg Olms Verlag. (Päpüböl kobü dabükot nulik ela Volapük die Weltsprache ela Schleyer.)
 Kniele, Rupert. 1889. Das erste Jahrzehnt der Weltsprache Volapük. Verlag von A. Schoy, Buchhandlung, Ueberlingen a. B. (Dönu päpübon ün 1984 fa Reinhard Haupenthal, Saarbrücken: Editions Iltis.) (Vödem rigädik, ma dabükot balid).
 Sigmund Spielmann. 1887. Volapük-Almanach für 1888, verfasst von Sigmund Spielmann. I. Jahrgang. Lekaled volapüka plo yel balmil jöltum jölsejöl, pelautöl fa Spielmann Sigmund. Yelüp balid. Leipzig: Mayer. (Vödem rigädik.)

Year of birth missing
Year of death missing
Austrian educators
Volapük
Place of birth missing